Antonio Baruffaldi (1793–1832) was an Italian artist. He was born in Ferrara, in (Emilia Romagna) in the north east of Italy, close to Bologna and Venice. He actually trained as a painter in the city of Venice. The gallery of his native city, Ferrara, possesses some of his work: Virgin reading and Tancred and Armida.

Sources

1793 births
1832 deaths
18th-century Italian painters
Italian male painters
19th-century Italian painters
Painters from Ferrara
19th-century Italian male artists
18th-century Italian male artists